Matěj Novák (born 6 November 1989) is a Czech former competitive ice dancer. With former partner Lucie Myslivečková, he is the 2010 Golden Spin of Zagreb champion and the 2011 Czech national champion. He currently competes with Gabriela Kubová.

Career 
Myslivečkova and Novák won a silver and bronze on the Junior Grand Prix circuit. They finished as high as 8th at Junior Worlds in 2009 and debuted at senior Worlds in the same season. They were 21st at the 2009 World Championships.

Myslivečkova and Novák made their senior Grand Prix debut in the 2009–2010 season, finishing 7th at the Cup of Russia and 9th at the NHK Trophy. They moved up to 16th at Worlds. During the 2010–2011 season, they won silver at the Ondrej Nepela Memorial, finished 6th at the NHK Trophy and 5th at the Cup of Russia. They won their first international title at the 2010 Golden Spin of Zagreb. Following the 2010-11 season, Novak decided to retire from competitive skating to do ballroom dancing.

In 2012, Novák decided to return to ice dancing, teaming up with Gabriela Kubová.

Programs

With Kubová

With Myslivečková

Competitive highlights

With Kubová

With Myslivečková

References

External links 

 
 

Czech male ice dancers
1989 births
Living people
Sportspeople from Pardubice